Duberdicus or Duberdico, was a god of fountains, lakes, and oceans in Lusitanian mythology, in the cultural area of Lusitania (in the territory of modern Portugal).

See also

List of Lusitanian deities
Lusitanian mythology

References
Inscriptionum hispaniae latinarum pg894

Lusitanian gods
Sea and river gods